The San Francisco Pass is a pass over the Andes mountains which connects Argentina and Chile. The highest point of this pass is at  AMSL.

Location 
In the Argentine side, route N 60 ascends from Fiambala at  AMSL in a deep valley formed by  mountains.

On the Chilean side the route CH-31 connects Copiapó with the ChileanArgentine border. On the way it passes next to Maricunga's salt flat on the Nevado Tres Cruces National Park and Laguna Verde. The area is surrounded by volcanoes and high peaks as the Cerro Falso Azufre, the volcano San Francisco, the Incahuasi and highest volcano in the world, Nevado Ojos del Salado, among others.

Gallery

See also 

 Cerro Torta
 Laguna Verde (Chile)

References 

Argentina–Chile border crossings
Mountain passes of Chile
Mountain passes of Argentina
Mountain passes of the Andes
Landforms of Atacama Region
Landforms of Catamarca Province